HOA or Hoa may refer to:

Arts
 Hardwell On Air, a Dutch radio programme
 House of Anubis, a television drama series
 Hands of Asclepius, a fictional organization in the video game Trauma Center: Under the Knife 2

Law
 Heads of agreement (law)
 Homeowner association, an organization in a subdivision, planned community, or condominium that makes and enforces rules for the properties in its jurisdiction and often collects monthly fees

Other uses
 Higher-order Ambisonics, a full-sphere surround sound technique.
 Hoa people, An Overseas Chinese minority group residing in Vietnam.  
 ǂHõã language (ISO 639: huc), a Khoisan language of Botswana.
 Hoava language (ISO 639: hoa), an Oceanic language of the Solomon Islands.
 Horn of Africa, a peninsula in eastern Africa that juts for hundreds of kilometers into the Arabian Sea.
 House of Assembly, the name of several current and former national and sub-national legislatures.
 Hypertrophic osteopathy, a bone disease secondary to cancer in the lungs.
 hoa, a title for Muisca rulers